Ash-Shiraa (or Al-Shiraa) (Arabic: الشراع| The Sail in English) is an Arabic weekly magazine published in Lebanon. The magazine is one of the oldest publications in the country.

History and profile
Ash-Shira was launched in 1948. It is described as an anti-Syrian publication and is based in Beirut.

Content
The magazine was the first to break the news that the United States had been secretly selling weapons to Iran, a scandal that eventually grew into the Iran-Contra Affair. The report was published in the magazine on 3 November 1986.

See also
List of magazines in Lebanon

References

1948 establishments in Lebanon
Arabic-language magazines
Magazines established in 1948
Magazines published in Beirut
News magazines published in Africa
Weekly magazines published in Lebanon
Weekly news magazines